Xestiodion is a genus of beetles in the family Cerambycidae, containing the following species:

 Xestiodion annulipes (Buquet in Guérin-Méneville, 1844)
 Xestiodion pictipes (Newman, 1838)
 Xestiodion similis (Melzer, 1920)

References

Cerambycini